The , signed as Route 2, is one of the routes of the Hanshin Expressway system serving the Keihanshin area in Kansai, Japan.

See also

References

External links

Roads in Osaka Prefecture
2
1994 establishments in Japan